Valier is a town in Pondera County, Montana, United States. The population was 530 at the 2020 census.

History
The town was named for Peter Valier, who supervised construction of the Montana Western Railway's railroad line between Valier and Conrad, the county seat of Pondera County. The town was incorporated in 1909.

Geography
Valier is located at  (48.306153, -112.251045). The town borders Lake Frances. The Swift Dam is nearby.

Climate
According to the Köppen Climate Classification system, Valier has a semi-arid climate, abbreviated "BSk" on climate maps.

Demographics

2010 census
As of the census of 2010, there were 509 people, 234 households, and 138 families living in the town. The racial makeup of the town was 87.4% White, 8.1% Native American, 0.6% Asian, and 3.9% from two or more races. Hispanic or Latino of any race were 1.0% of the population.

There were 234 households, of which 22.6% had children under the age of 18 living with them, 46.6% were married couples living together, 8.5% had a female householder with no husband present, 3.8% had a male householder with no wife present, and 41.0% were non-families. 37.6% of all households were made up of individuals, and 17.1% had someone living alone who was 65 years of age or older. The average household size was 2.18 and the average family size was 2.88.

The median age in the town was 47.3 years. 21.8% of residents were under the age of 18; 7.3% were between the ages of 18 and 24; 17.6% were from 25 to 44; 31.9% were from 45 to 64; and 21.4% were 65 years of age or older. The gender makeup of the town was 48.1% male and 51.9% female.

2000 census
As of the census of 2000, there were 498 people, 220 households, and 143 families living in the town. The population density was 418.5 people per square mile (161.6/km2). There were 275 housing units at an average density of 231.1 per square mile (89.2/km2). The racial makeup of the town was 92.17% White, 5.22% Native American, and 2.61% from two or more races. Hispanic or Latino of any race were 1.20% of the population.

There were 220 households, out of which 29.5% had children under the age of 18 living with them, 53.2% were married couples living together, 7.3% had a female householder with no husband present, and 35.0% were non-families. 33.2% of all households were made up of individuals, and 18.6% had someone living alone who was 65 years of age or older. The average household size was 2.26 and the average family size was 2.87.

In the town, the population was spread out, with 24.5% under the age of 18, 5.0% from 18 to 24, 24.1% from 25 to 44, 26.1% from 45 to 64, and 20.3% who were 65 years of age or older. The median age was 43 years. For every 100 females there were 105.8 males. For every 100 females age 18 and over, there were 94.8 males.

The median income for a household in the town was $30,000, and the median income for a family was $36,750. Males had a median income of $25,156 versus $16,875 for females. The per capita income for the town was $14,862. About 7.9% of families and 8.4% of the population were below the poverty line, including 3.5% of those under age 18 and 17.0% of those age 65 or over.

Economy
Agriculture, including cattle ranching, is the main industry in the area. There are three Hutterite colonies nearby.

Education
Valier Schools educates students from kindergarten through 12th grade. Valier High School's team name is the Panthers.

Valier Public Library serves the area.

Transportation
Valier is on Highway 44, an east–west roadway that connects I-15 and US 89 at the midpoint between Glacier National Park and Great Falls. The local airport has a  grass landing strip; also, water planes can land on the lake.

Notable person
Author Ivan Doig graduated from Valier High School.

References

External links
 http://townofvalier.com
 http://www.valier.org

Towns in Pondera County, Montana